Ninian Home (1732 - 1795), was a British plantation owner and the Governor of Grenada during the Fédon Rebellion, a revolt against British rule led primarily by free mixed-race French-speakers that took place between 2 March 1795, and 19 June 1796. Home was captured and held hostage during the rebellion and was eventually murdered.

Biography
Ninian Home was born in 1732 in Scotland and made his fortune from his plantations in Grenada which enabled him to purchase Paxton House, Berwickshire from his uncle, Patrick Home, in 1773.

Home was sent to Virginia as a young man to earn his living. From 1764 Home spent much of his time in Grenada where he owned two plantations which were manned by over 400 enslaved people growing coffee and cocoa. He owned the Waltham Estate in the parish of St Mark from 1780 as well as Paraclete in the parish of St Andrew.

Ninian Home became Governor of Grenada in 1793.

On 3 March 1795, the second day of the revolt led by Julien Fédon, Governor Home was captured along with around 50 others and held hostage. Most of the hostages, including Ninian Home, were executed by the rebels after a failed attack on their camp by the British.

Ninian's brother, George Home of Wedderburn, succeeded to his Scottish and Grenadian estates upon his death.

References

1732 births
1795 deaths
Governors of British Grenada